Soyuz TMA-15M was a 2014 flight to the International Space Station. It transported three members of the Expedition 42 crew to the International Space Station. TMA-15M was the 124th flight of a Soyuz spacecraft, the first flight launching in 1967. The Soyuz remained docked to the space station for the Expedition 43 increment, serving as an emergency escape vehicle until departing and returning to Earth as scheduled in June 2015.

Crew

Backup crew

Mission highlights

Launch, rendezvous and docking
Soyuz TMA-15M launched successfully aboard a Soyuz-FG rocket from the Baikonur Cosmodrome in Kazakhstan at 21:01 UTC on Sunday, 23 November 2014. The spacecraft reached low Earth orbit approximately nine minutes after lift-off. After executing rendezvous maneuvers, the Soyuz docked with the International Space Station at 02:49 UTC on 24 November, with hatch opening occurring at 05:00 UTC.

Soyuz TMA-15M was scheduled to remain docked to the ISS—serving as an emergency escape vehicle, planned to be on-board until  May 2015. The landing was delayed until June 2015, when it was set to depart and return Shkaplerov, Cristoforetti and Virts to Earth.

Undocking and return to Earth
Soyuz TMA-15M accidentally fired its engines one day before undocking. The one minute burn slightly shifted ISS position.

Soyuz TMA-15M undocked from the ISS at 10:20 UTC on 11 June 2015, containing Shkaplerov, Cristoforetti, and Virts. Following a deorbit burn, the Soyuz spacecraft's descent module reentered the Earth's atmosphere. The crew landed safely in Kazakhstan at 13:44 UTC on 11 June, just over three hours after departing the ISS.

Gallery

References

Crewed Soyuz missions
Spacecraft launched in 2014
2014 in Russia
Spacecraft which reentered in 2015
Spacecraft launched by Soyuz-FG rockets